The Vestfyn Line is a planned high-speed rail line on the Danish island of Funen, to be built between Odense and Middelfart.

Background
The Copenhagen–Ringsted Line, Denmark's first high-speed rail line, opened in 2019. As part of plans for high-speed rail in Denmark under the Hour Model, speed increases and sections of new line have been planned between the cities of Copenhagen, Odense, Aarhus, Esbjerg and Aalborg. In 2013, this was outlined further in the Togfond plan, which estimated the cost of a new Odense to Middelfart/Fredericia railway at DKK4.5 billion in 2017.

Approval for the construction of the line was given in November 2019, with construction to begin in 2023. The Vestfyn Line is proposed to shorten the route between Odense and Middelfart by 4 km and reduce journey times by 5 minutes.

Route
The new high-speed is planned to roughly follow the boundary of the E20 Fynske Motorvej road. The line will free up capacity on the existing line; a commuter rail service on this line is planned similar to the S-train in Copenhagen.

See also
High-speed rail in Denmark

References

High-speed railway lines in Denmark
Proposed railway lines in Denmark